The 2010–11 CONCACAF Champions League Group Stage was played from August to October 2010. The matchdays were August 17–19, 
August 24–26, September 14–16, September 21–23, September 28–30, and October 19–21, 2010.

The draw for the Preliminary Round and the Group Stage was held on May 19, 2010, at the CONCACAF headquarters in New York City. Teams from the same association (excluding "wildcard" teams which replace a team from another association) may not be drawn with each other.

A total of 16 teams competed, which included 8 automatic qualifiers and 8 winners of the Preliminary Round. The teams were divided into four groups of four, where each team played each other home-and-away in a round-robin format. If two teams were tied on points, the following tie-breaking criteria shall be applied, in order, to determine the ranking of teams:
 Greater number of points earned in matches between the teams concerned
 Greater goal difference in matches between the teams concerned
 Greater number of goals scored away from home in matches between the teams concerned
 Reapply first three criteria if two or more teams are still tied
 Greater goal  difference in all group matches
 Greater number of goals scored in group matches
 Greater number of goals scored away in all group matches
 Drawing of lots

The top two teams of each group advanced to the Championship Round.

Groups

All Times U.S. Eastern (UTC−04:00)

Group A

Group B

Group C

Group D

Notes
Note 1: Olmpia v Toluca originally was scheduled to be played at Estadio Tiburcio Carías Andino in Tegucigalpa. But officials were forced to move the match to Estadio Olímpico Metropolitano in San Pedro Sula when high winds toppled advertising boards and a cement wall ringing the top of the stadium, sending debris to the street below onto cars and killing a taxi driver.

References

External links
 CONCACAF Champions League official website

Group Stage